Yuzbash Mahallehsi (also Romanized as Yūzbāsh Maḥallehsī; also known as Yūzbāshī) is a village in Gerdeh Rural District, in the Central District of Namin County, Ardabil Province, Iran. At the 2006 census, its population was 22, in 8 families.

References 

Towns and villages in Namin County